New Parliament Building can mean:

 Parliament House (Malta)
 New Parliament Building, Grenada
 New Zimbabwe Parliament Building